Jiucheng is a town of Weixin County in northeastern Yunnan province, China, located (as the crow flies) less than  from the border with Sichuan,  north of the county seat, and  northeast of Zhaotong at an elevation of only . , it has 20 villages under its administration.

References 

Township-level divisions of Zhaotong